Puppi is an Italian surname. Notable people with the surname include:

Francesco Puppi (born 1992), Italian long-distance runner
Giampietro Puppi (1917–2006), Italian physicist
Lionello Puppi (1931–2018), Italian art historian and politician
Paolo Puppi (born 1999),  writer

See also
Puppis, a constellation in the southern sky

Italian-language surnames